Clubul Sportiv Pandurii Lignitul Târgu Jiu, commonly known as Pandurii Târgu Jiu or simply Pandurii, was a Romanian football club based in Târgu Jiu, Gorj County, which competed last time in the Liga IV.

Founded in 1962 following the merger of Flacăra-Unirea Târgu Jiu and CIL Târgu Jiu, the team's best performances are finishing the 2012–13 season as runners-up in the Liga I, the top tier of the Romanian league system, and playing a League Cup final in 2015. Gorjenii qualified for the first time for a European competition in the 2013–14 campaign, when they reached the group stages of the UEFA Europa League.

The colours of Pandurii Târgu Jiu are white and blue, and they play their home games at the Tudor Vladimirescu Stadium, which has a seating capacity of 12,518.

History

Founding and lower divisions (1962–2005)
Pandurii Târgu Jiu was founded in August 1962, after the merger of the two big rivals from the town, Flacăra-Unirea Târgu Jiu and CIL Târgu-Jiu. The club entered the fourth division of Romanian football, with a strong objective, to promote immediately in the third division. And the target was reached, Pandurii gaining the promotion to Divizia C in June 1963. Their first game in this division was played on 1 September 1963, against Siderurgistul Hunedoara. Pandurii won by a big margin, 6–0, goals scored by Chițu (12'), Nelu Băloi (35'), Melinte (53', 80') and Vasilescu (83', 85').

In the first years, Pandurii finished constantly in the first half of the standings, so the club decided to attack a promotion to Divizia B. In the 1976–77 season, with a young team and with Titus Ozon as coach, the dream came true. Pandurii dominated the competition, climbed from the first stages on top of the standings and won the promotion to the second division. But this level was a much bigger hat to wear for Pandurii, who relegated the next season back to Divizia C.

The following years, the team changed frequently the division, promoting to Divizia B and relegating after a few years. They played in Divizia B between 1979 and 1983 then between 1986 and 1991. After a decade in Divizia C, in 2000 the team promoted again in the second league, and in 2004 finished second, behind Sportul Studențesc.

Beginning years in the top league (2005–2011) 
The performance from the last seasons was an incentive for the management who decided to push for the first presence of Pandurii in Divizia A. With Emil Săndoi as coach, and with a young group of players like Tiberiu Lung and Sorin Vintilescu but also with some experienced players like, Florin Popete, Robert Vancea and Romulus Buia, the team won the promotion.

It was difficult to maintain its position in Divizia A, and Pandurii finished their first season in the 15th place, right below the relegation line. But the Romanian Football Federation decided at the end of the season not to give Sportul Studențesc their licence for the following year, and kept instead the first team under the line, Pandurii. With the bullet dodged, the management decided to enforce the team, so the relegation shouldn't be a problem.

Alexandru Păcurar, Ciprian Vasilache and Liviu Mihai were brought, and the team finished 11th in the 2006–07 season. They kept their position at the middle of the table for the next seasons.

In 2010, they finished below the line but avoided the relegation after the withdrawal of Internațional Curtea de Argeș, team that ended tenth but the owner decided to disband the club. With a lot of players from Internațional Curtea de Argeș like Vlad Chiricheș, Mihai Pintilii, and Dan Nistor, Pandurii were 13th the following season.

Ascent and first European participation (2011–2013)

In the 2011–12 season the team reached the highest place in history, finishing seventh. For a while, they were fifth and the fans hoped for Europa League.

The following season saw Pandurii finishing as Liga I runners-up for the first time ever, qualifying for the 2013–14 UEFA Europa League, the club's first ever European participation. After defeating Levadia Tallinn, Hapoel Tel Aviv and Braga, Pandurii entered the Group stage, being drawn into Group E with F.C. Paços de Ferreira, FC Dnipro and ACF Fiorentina.

Achieving performance (2013–2017)

On 10 March 2015, with Edward Iordănescu as coach Pandurii defeated FC Dinamo București in the semi-finals of the new established competition Cupa Ligii, to qualify for their first ever cup final. On their way to play the final they beat one of the Romanian giants FC Petrolul Ploiești at Ilie Oană Stadium. In the final FC Steaua București beat Pandurii at Arena Națională stadium but with a controversial penalty in the beginning of the match.

In the 2015–16, season of Liga I Pandurii had many achievements along the season with the same coach and players like UEFA Europa League winner Cristian Săpunaru, Dan Nistor, Ioan Hora and Mihai Răduț and Narcis Răducan as president. In April 2015 they became the first team to win a match in Liga I with the new play-off, play-out system. On 6 February 2016, they secured both a place in the competition play-offs and a place in a European competition next year with a victory with ASA 2013 Târgu Mureș. During this season they had the most matches without a defeat, about 10 games. At the end of the season, Pandurii finished on the podium as third-place qualifying for the second time in UEFA Europa League, but this time in the third qualifying round.

Back to the lower leagues (2017–present) 

Although the team had a fairly good start for the season 2016–17, with players like Lucian Sânmărtean or George Țucudean coming at the club, and playing in the summer against Maccabi Tel Aviv F.C. in Europa League, problems occurred in the second half of the season. The main sponsor started having problems and for this reason they did not fund the team anymore. Many players have left the team so the young players from the second team were brought to the first team along with other players from elsewhere.  Unfortunately after 12 seasons in Liga 1 Pandurii relegated for the first time since the 2005 promotion but fought to avoid it until the last round.

For the 2017–18 Liga II, Pandurii has been prepared with some players promoted from the second team or from the youth teams and moved to Motru until the new stadium was completed in 2019.

In the wake of the 2020–21 Liga II season, Pandurii relegated in Liga III for the first time after 21 years.

Ground
 

The club play its matches at the new Tudor Vladimirescu Stadium, opened in 2019.

Honours

Domestic

Youth

Rankings
This is the UEFA club's coefficient as of 1 November 2018:

Records and statistics

Domestic
Liga I seasons: 12
Liga I play-offs seasons: 1
Liga I longest unbeaten run: 10 (2015–16)
Place 30 out of 98 teams in Liga I all-time table
Cupa României best result: Semi-finals (2006–07)
Cupa Ligii seasons: 3
The most successful team from Gorj County

European
UEFA Europa League seasons: 2
UEFA Europa League best result: Group Stages (2013–14)
UEFA Europa League biggest win: 4–0 vs. Levadia Tallinn (2013–14)

League history

European Cups history 

Notes
 1Q: First qualifying round
 2Q: Second qualifying round
 3Q: Third qualifying round
 PO: Play-off round

European cups all-time statistics

Notable former players
The footballers enlisted below have had international cap(s) for their respective countries at junior and/or senior level and/or more than 100 caps for CS Pandurii Târgu Jiu.

Romania
  Paul Anton
  Alin Chibulcutean
  Vlad Chiricheș
  Liviu Ciobotariu
  Constantin Grecu
  Ovidiu Herea
  Ioan Hora
  Alexandru Maxim
  Dan Nistor
  Daniel Orac
  Mihai Pintilii
  Victor Pițurcă
  Marian Pleașcă

Romania
  Florin Popete
  Mihai Răduț
  Adrian Ropotan
  Adrian Rusu
  Lucian Sânmărtean
  Cristian Săpunaru
  Răzvan Stanca
  Iulian Ștefan
  George Țucudean
  Bogdan Ungurușan
  Robert Vancea
  Claudiu Voiculeț

Bosnia and Herzegovina
  Adnan Gušo
  Stojan Vranješ

Brazil
  Cardoso

Congo
  Armel Disney

Cyprus
  Paraskevas Christou

Czech Republic
  Lukáš Droppa

Ivory Coast
  Constant Djakpa
  Ousmane Viera

Lithuania
  Deivydas Matulevičius

Nigeria
  Christian Obodo

Portugal
  Pedro Mingote
  Vasco Fernandes

Slovenia
  Jaka Štromajer

Notable former managers

  Ilie Balaci
  Sorin Cârțu
  Petre Grigoraș
  Marin Ion
  Edward Iordănescu
  Eugen Neagoe
  Titus Ozon
  Emil Săndoi

References

External links
 Official website
 Club profile on UEFA's official website

 
Football clubs in Gorj County
Association football clubs established in 1962
Association football clubs disestablished in 2022
Târgu Jiu
Liga I clubs
Liga II clubs
Liga III clubs
Liga IV clubs
1962 establishments in Romania
2022 disestablishments in Romania
Pandurii Târgu Jiu